Strigocossus moderata is a moth in the  family Cossidae. It is found in Cameroon, Gabon, Kenya, Malawi, Mozambique, Sierra Leone, South Africa, Tanzania and Zambia.

The larvae feed on Cassia and Pterolobium species.

References

Zeuzerinae